Diabetologia is a monthly peer-reviewed medical journal covering diabetology and is the official journal of the European Association for the Study of Diabetes. It is published by Springer Science+Business Media and the editor-in-chief is Hindrik Mulder (Lund University). According to the Journal Citation Reports, the journal has a 2021 impact factor of 10.460, ranked 11/146 in Endocrinology and Metabolism. The 5-Year Impact Factor is 10.617.

Previous editors 
The following persons have been editors-in-chief of the journal:

References

External links 
 

Springer Science+Business Media academic journals
Monthly journals
English-language journals
Endocrinology journals
Publications established in 1965